The canton of Saint-Étienne-4 (before 2015: Saint-Étienne-Nord-Ouest-1) is a French administrative division located in the department of Loire and the Auvergne-Rhône-Alpes region. It has the following communes:
Saint-Étienne (partly)
Villars

See also
Cantons of the Loire department

References

Cantons of Loire (department)